Delicias de Concepción is a municipality in the Morazán department of El Salvador. 

Municipalities of the Morazán Department